This article consists of the list of international official and work trips made by Ilham Aliyev, the fourth and current President of Azerbaijan, during the terms of his presidency.

First Presidential term

Trips during the first presidential term (2003–2008)

Second Presidential term
Trips during the second presidential term (2008–2013)

Third Presidential term

Trips during the third presidential term (2013–2018)

Fourth Presidential term

Trips during the third presidential term (2018–Present)

See also

 President of Azerbaijan
 Ilham Aliyev

References

Politics of Azerbaijan
Diplomacy-related lists
Diplomatic visits by heads of state
Lists of diplomatic visits by heads of state
Azerbaijan diplomacy-related lists
Ilham Aliyev